Upleta railway station  is a railway station serving in Rajkot district of Gujarat State of India. It is under Bhavnagar railway division of Western Railway Zone of Indian Railways. Passenger and Express trains halt here.

Trains 

The following trains halt at Upleta railway station in both directions:

 19571/52 Rajkot - Porbandar Express (Via Jetalsar)
 12949/50 Porbandar - Santragachi Kavi Guru Superfast Express

References

Railway stations in Rajkot district
Bhavnagar railway division